The Treatment may refer to:

 The Treatment (novel)
 The Treatment (2001 film)
 The Treatment (2006 film)
 The Treatment (2014 film)
 The Treatment, political tactic used by Lyndon B. Johnson
 The Treatment (band), a British hard rock band
 The Treatment (Early Day Miners album), 2009
 The Treatment (Mr. Probz album), 2013

See also 
 Treatment (disambiguation)